Sardar Riaz Mehmood Khan Mazari  is a Pakistani politician who has been a member of the National Assembly of Pakistan since August 2018.

Political career
He was elected to the National Assembly of Pakistan from Constituency NA-195 (Rajanpur-III) as a candidate of Pakistan Tehreek-e-Insaf in 2018 Pakistani general election.

References

Living people
Baloch politicians
Pakistani MNAs 2018–2023
Pakistan Tehreek-e-Insaf MNAs
Mazari family
Year of birth missing (living people)